Jan Arvid Högbom (born 3 October 1929) is a Swedish radio astronomer and astrophysicist.

Education
Högbom obtained his PhD in 1959 from the University of Cambridge with Martin Ryle.

Career and research
Högbom is most well known for the development of the CLEAN algorithm for deconvolution of images created in radio astronomy, published in 1974. This allows the use of arrays of small antennae, generating incomplete sampling data, to effectively simulate a much larger aperture. Högbom was also the first to use Earth rotation synthesis imaging in a small test.

These methods pioneered by Högbom are still extensively used and combined, e.g. in the imaging of the central supermassive black hole of the Messier 87 galaxy.

Awards and honours
Högbom was elected member of the Royal Swedish Academy of Sciences in 1981.

References 

20th-century Swedish astronomers
Alumni of the University of Cambridge

1929 births
Living people
Members of the Royal Swedish Academy of Sciences
Radio astronomers